KACY (102.5 FM) is a radio station licensed in Arkansas City, Kansas, United States, broadcasting a classic hits format.  The station is owned by Tornado Alley Communications, LLC.

History
Bob Fisher at Third Coast Broadcasting put this station on the air as KLPQ on August 26, 1999. On August 26, 2000, the station changed its call sign to KACY.  Previously, the KACY call letters which are branded as a reference to Ark City were previously used by an AM station in Lafayette LA with "Acadiana" branding.

Previous logo
 (KACY's logo under previous rock format)

References

External links
102.5 The River website

ACY
Radio stations established in 1999
1999 establishments in Kansas